The cheetah (Acinonyx jubatus) is the fastest of all land animals, and a member of the family Felidae.

Cheetah or Cheeta may also refer to:

Animals
 American cheetah, a prehistoric genus of big cats
 Cheeta, a chimpanzee appearing in numerous Tarzan movies

Arts, entertainment, and media

Films
 Cheetah (1989 film), a Disney film
 Cheetah (1994 film), a Hindi-language Indian film by Harmesh Malhotra

Music 
 Cheetah (band), an Australian rock band
 Cheetah (EP), a 2016 EP by Aphex Twin
 Cheetah Records, a record label

Other uses in arts, entertainment, and media
 Cheetah (character), a fictional supervillain in the DC Comics Universe
 Cheetah (magazine), an early rock music journal

Automobiles 
 Bill Thomas Cheetah, a US sports car developed by the Bill Thomas Motorsports company
 Cheetah MMPV, an armored fighting vehicle
 Cheetah Racing Cars, Australian race cars manufactured in the 1960s, 1970s, and 1980s 
 Flakpanzer Gepard, or anti-aircraft cannon tank Cheetah
 Lamborghini Cheetah, a large 4×4 off-road prototype

Aviation 
 Armstrong Siddeley Cheetah, an aircraft engine used during World War II
 Atlas Cheetah, a South African military aircraft
 Avian Cheetah, a British hang glider
 Grumman American AA-5A Cheetah, a model of the Grumman American AA-5 light general aviation aircraft
 HAL Cheetah, an Indian version of the Aérospatiale Lama light helicopter
 Rainbow Cheetah, a South African ultralight aircraft

Brands and enterprises
 Cheetah (nightclub), a 1960s New York club frequented by Jimi Hendrix
 Cheetah Marketing, a UK-based computer hardware and musical equipment company
 Cheetah Mobile, a Chinese mobile internet company, developers of the live.me app and others
 Cheetah Power Surge, a brand of energy drink produced by D'Angelo Brands
 Cheetah's, a Las Vegas nightclub

Computing and technology
 Cheetah3D, a computer graphics program for 3D modeling, animation and rendering
 CheetahTemplate, a Python template engine
 Mac OS X 10.0, an operating system version codenamed "Cheetah"
 Cheetah, a forerunner of the IBM POWER instruction set architecture
 Cheetah, a hard drive made by Seagate Technology
 Cheetah, a robot by the Biomimetic Robotics Lab, part of the Department of Mechanical Engineering, School of Engineering, Massachusetts Institute of Technology
 Cheetah, a robot by Boston Dynamics

Sports clubs 
 Cheetahs (rugby union), a South African rugby union club
Cheetah F.C., a Ghanaian association football club
 Free State Cheetahs, a South African rugby union club

Weaponry
 .22 CHeetah, a custom cartridge
 Beretta Cheetah, a semi-automatic pistol

Other uses 
 Argina amanda, a moth in the family Erebidae also known as the cheetah
 Cheetah (rapper), a South Korean rapper
 Cheetah (Wild Adventures), a wooden roller coaster at Wild Adventures in Georgia, United States

See also
 Cheater
 Cheater (disambiguation)
 Cheetor, a Transformers character
 Chester Cheetah, a fictional character and the official mascot for Frito-Lay's Cheetos brand snacks 
 Chita (disambiguation)
 The Cheetah Girls (disambiguation)